The Entebbe–Kampala Expressway, also known as the "Kampala–Entebbe Expressway" or the "Entebbe–Kampala Highway", is a four-lane toll highway in the Central Region of Uganda. The highway links Entebbe International Airport, the country's largest civilian and military airport, to Kampala, the country's capital and largest metropolitan area. Originally, the highway was planned for commissioning in 2016, but because of the delayed works, commissioning was done on 15 June 2018 by Uganda's sitting president, Yoweri Museveni. Recently, the Uganda Minister for Works and Transport, Gen. Katumba Wamala launched the toll point at Kajjansi along Kampala–Entebbe Road.

Location
The entire highway is a four-lane, dual carriage expressway, with limited access.

Overview
The  Kampala Entebbe Expressway was constructed with the overall strategy of decongesting the Greater Kampala Metropolitan area.  It is the first toll road in Uganda and it provides an alternative to the free existing surface road, known as the Kampala–Entebbe Road, or simply Entebbe Road which is narrow, congested, and not sufficient to handle the heavy traffic traversing it. The expressway is gated and vehicles that access it have to pay a toll charge.

History

In 2009, the Government of Uganda (GOU) began consultations with the Government of the People's Republic of China regarding the construction of a four-lane (dual-carriage) highway connecting Entebbe and Kampala. In November 2010, the two governments signed an agreement where the Chinese government, through the Exim Bank of China, would lend up to US$350 million for the construction of the highway, repayable over forty years. The contract was awarded to China Communications Construction Company, which also constructed the Soroti-Lira Road. Construction began in 2012.

Construction costs

In 2012, the expressway was estimated to cost US$476 million (UGX:1.19 trillion). Of this, US$350 million (UGX:875 billion) is a loan from the Exim Bank of China at 2 percent annual interest. The remaining US$126 million (UGX:315 billion) was provided by the GOU. GOU has already, or will provide in the future, another UGX:123 billion to compensate land owners along the expressway route.

Developments
On 21 November 2012, the president of Uganda commissioned the beginning of construction of the highway at a ceremony at Kyengera, along the Kampala-Masaka road. The EastAfrican reported in August 2017 that completion was scheduled for May 2018. The Daily Monitor made a similar report in November 2017. The completed road was commissioned on Friday 15 June 2018.

The completed road had to wait for the installation of toll-paying technology at the payment booths and the passage of the law authoring the building and use of toll roads. A new completion date had been put at 16 November 2018. However, the expressway opened to the public, effective 15 June 2018. It was expected that collection of toll fees on this highway would begin in January 2020.

In February 2021, the Daily Monitor reported that the French company Egis Road Operation SA, a member of the Egis Group conglomerate, had been selected to design, install, operate and maintain the highway's toll-collection system. The company will retain a percentage of the toll fees in exchange for its services.

Collection of toll fees on the expressway, ranging from USh:5,000 (US$1.4) to USh:18,000 (US$5.00), depending on the size of the vehicle, began on 8 January 2022.

In March 2022, Egis Roads Operation SA, began the process of installing street lighting along the entire  expressway.

At the end of May 2022, it was reported by PML Daily that Egis, the road management company had collected over USh13 billion (approx. US$3.5 million), in the first five months of operation, averaging 20,000 vehicles daily.

Points of interest
The following points of interest lie close or near the Entebbe–Kampala Expressway: (1) the town of Entebbe in Wakiso District (2) the settlement of Abayita Ababiri in Wakiso District (3) the community of Akright City in Wakiso District (4) settlement of Kabojja in Wakiso District (5) neighborhood of Busega in Lubaga Division in the city of Kampala, where the highway will join the Kampala Northern Bypass Highway (6) neighborhood of Kajjansi in Wakiso District, where an arm of the highway will branch off to Munyonyo, on the northern shores of Lake Victoria (7) the suburb of Munyonyo in Makindye Division, in Kampala, where an arm of the highway ends.

Vehicle numbers
The vehicular traffic that accesses the expressway every month, has been made public, since January 2022. The table below illustrates the traffic trends across this road.

See also
 Kampala District
 Ssabagabo
 Wakiso District
 List of roads in Uganda

Photos and diagrams
The Map of Kampala-Entebbe Express Highway

References

External links
 Computer Simulation of Highway Design And Traffic Patterns
 Kampala- Entebbe Expressway receives 20,000 passages daily As of 20 June 2022.

Roads in Uganda
Wakiso District
Kampala District
Transport infrastructure completed in 2018
2018 establishments in Uganda